

Eleven Madison Park  is a New American fine dining restaurant located inside the Metropolitan Life North Building at 11 Madison Avenue in the Flatiron District of Manhattan, New York City. It has retained 3 Michelin stars since 2012, and was ranked third among The World's 50 Best Restaurants in 2016, and topped the list in 2017.

History 
The restaurant, initially designed by Bentel & Bentel, is located in the Metropolitan Life North Building, facing Madison Square, at the intersection of Madison Avenue and 24th Street. The restaurant originally opened in 1998 and was owned by restaurateur Danny Meyer. In 2006, Chef Daniel Humm and Will Guidara began working at Eleven Madison Park, and in 2011 they purchased it from Meyer. The restaurant group's name is Make it Nice.

Eleven Madison Park was closed for renovation between June 9 and October 11, 2017, and completely redesigned, in collaboration with Allied Works architectural firm.

Guidara and Humm parted ways in 2019, and Humm remained on as the sole owner of Make it Nice.

The restaurant closed again during the COVID-19 pandemic, converting into a commissary kitchen to produce meals for the food-insecure in New York City, in cooperation with the non-profit Rethink Food. In October 2020, Eleven Madison Park began a To Go program, offering dinners for pickup for the first time in its history. Every dinner purchased provides ten meals to New Yorkers experiencing food insecurity via the ongoing partnership with Rethink Food.

In June 2022, Business Insider reported the restaurant struggled with high employee turnover due to low wages and difficult working conditions, including 80-hour weeks. Although workers started at $15 per hour, tipping was banned at the restaurant.

Former employees told Insider that there was a significant waste of produce that would be trashed if the wrong size or otherwise unused rather than donated or composted.

Menu 
Until the pandemic shut down in March 2020, the restaurant offered guests a seasonal tasting menu that drew inspiration from local culture, history, and ingredients. The menu in the dining room consisted of 8–10 courses, and an abbreviated experience at the bar consisted of 5 courses. Both of these menus featured communal elements to enhance the experience. It was announced on May 3, 2021, that the restaurant would be eliminating all animal products, serving a strictly plant-based menu. The restaurant began serving this menu in June 2021, to mixed reviews.

Cookbooks 
The original Eleven Madison Park Cookbook was published in 2011; Humm and Guidara have released additional cookbooks including I Love New York: Ingredients and Recipes, The NoMad Cookbook, Eleven Madison Park: The Next Chapter, and Eleven Madison Park: The Next Chapter, Revised and Unlimited.

Awards
 La Liste, the list of the 1,000 best restaurants in the world according to France's Foreign Ministry,  ranked Eleven Madison Park 4th in the United States and 241st overall in its inaugural edition of December 2015.
 Relais & Châteaux – Eleven Madison Park designated as Grand Chef, 2008
 The New York Times – Four Stars, 2015 and 2009
 James Beard Foundation Award – Outstanding Service, 2016; Outstanding Chef, Daniel Humm, 2012; Outstanding Pastry Chef, Angela Pinkerton, 2011; Outstanding Restaurant, 2011; and Best Chef: New York City, Daniel Humm, 2010
 S. Pellegrino World's 50 Best Restaurants – Ranked #50 in 2010, #24 in 2011, #10 in 2012, #5 in 2013, #4 in 2014, #5 in 2015, #3 in 2016 and #1 in 2017.
 Grand Table du Monde – 2014
 Wine Spectator Grand Award – 2011–2016
 AAA Five Star Award (2012-2022)
 Forbes Travel Guide – Five Stars, 2010–2014
 Michelin Guide – Three Stars, 2012–2022
 Zagat – Rating of 28 in food, decor, and service in 2014. This makes it the top-ranked restaurant in the Flatiron District and one of the best restaurants in New York City.

See also
 List of Michelin starred restaurants
 List of Michelin 3-star restaurants in the United States

References

External links

 

1998 establishments in New York City
Flatiron District
French-American culture in New York City
French restaurants in New York City
Michelin Guide starred restaurants in New York (state)
Restaurants in Manhattan
Restaurants established in 1998
James Beard Foundation Award winners